A Christmas Accident is a 1912 American Christmas film. Prints and/or fragments of the film were found in the Dawson Film Find in 1978.

Story 
Two families live next door in the same house. The Biltons have many children and strive to make the ends meet. The Giltons are well to do. Mr. Gilton is a grumpy old man, who gets annoyed by the children. He accuses the Biltons of having poisoned his dog. On Christmas Eve Mr. Gilton accidentally bumps into the Bilton home, and he is overwhelmed when one of the children gives him her present.

Cast 
William Wadsworth - Mr. Gilton
Mrs. William Bechtel - Mr. Gilton's wife
Augustus Phillips - Mr. Bilton
Ida Williams - Mr. Bilton's wife
Edna Hammel - Cora Cordelia Bilton

See also
 List of Christmas films

References

Further reading 

* 
*

External links 

American Christmas drama films
American silent short films
American black-and-white films
1911 films
1910s Christmas drama films
1911 short films
1911 drama films
1912 drama films
1912 films
1910s English-language films
1910s American films
Silent American drama films